Honest John may refer to:

Politicians

United Kingdom
 John Battersby, councillor in Glasgow and trade union leader
 John Bowen (alderman), High Sheriff of Worcestershire
 John Fielden, British politician
 Mad Jack Fuller, British politician who preferred to be known as "Honest John" Fuller
John Lilburne (1614 – 1657), English Leveller during the English Civil Wars

United States
 John Davis (Massachusetts governor)
 John H. Farley, Mayor of Cleveland
 John Hart (New Jersey politician)
 John Hunn (governor), Governor of Delaware
 John Kelly (New York politician),  Tammany Hall politician
 John Letcher, Governor of Virginia
 John Moore (Illinois), Lieutenant-Governor of Illinois
 John J. Patterson (1830–1912) United States senator from South Carolina
 John Holbrook Powers, Nebraska politician
 John F. Shafroth, Governor of Colorado
 John Sparks (Nevada politician)
 John Walsh (Dakota politician)
 John Whiteaker, Governor of Oregon
 John J. Williams (senator)

Elsewhere
 John Martin (Young Irelander), Irish politician
 John Tonkin, Australian politician
 John White (New Zealand politician)

Athletes
 John Anderson (outfielder), baseball player
 John Barham Day, jockey
 John Clapp (baseball), baseball player
 John Eubank, baseball player
 John Gaffney, baseball umpire
 John Kelly, baseball player nicknamed "Kick Kelly" and "Honest John"
 John McCloskey (baseball manager)
 John McKenna, rugby player
John Morrill, baseball player
 John A. Warren, football player
 John Katan, wrestler

Fictional characters
 "Honest John" Worthington Foulfellow, a character in Disney's 1940 film Pinocchio
 a character in the 1986 An American Tail
 a character in Marvel Comics' S-Men
 a character in Belle of the Yukon
 the protagonist of an 1875 novel by John William De Forest

Other uses
 Honest John Plain, guitarist with The Boys
 the MGR-1 Honest John, a nuclear-capable missile
 John Philip Wood, Scots historian
 John Brown Russwurm, abolitionist
 John Crocker, officer in the British Army
John Roberts, 18th-century Irish architect
 John Stephenson (coachbuilder)
 a 1959 single produced by Felton Jarvis
 Honest Jon's, a record store
 "Honest John", a type of open bar where patrons serve themselves and leave payment in a jar or drawer, on the honor system.